Kai Ham is a village in Sai Kung District, Hong Kong.

Administration
Kai Ham, including Wang Che, is a recognized village under the New Territories Small House Policy.

History
At the time of the 1911 census, the population of Wang Che was 5. The number of males was 4.

References

External links

 Delineation of area of existing village Kai Ham (Sai Kung) for election of resident representative (2019 to 2022)

Villages in Sai Kung District, Hong Kong